F/X (also known as or subtitled Murder by Illusion) is a 1986 American action thriller film directed by Robert Mandel, written by Gregory Fleeman and Robert T. Megginson, and starring Bryan Brown, Brian Dennehy, Diane Venora, Cliff De Young and Angela Bassett in her film debut. The film follows an expert (Brown) in the art of special effects (F/X) with a reputation built by his work on many low-budget hack-and-slash films such as I Dismember Mama. The Department of Justice hires him to stage the murder of a gangster about to enter the Witness Protection Program. He agrees, but then things get complicated. Meanwhile, a New York City police detective (Dennehy) is investigating the faked murder and cannot understand why the Justice Department is even less helpful than usual. A sequel, F/X2: The Deadly Art of Illusion, was released in 1991. A spinoff TV series entitled F/X: The Series was produced from 1996 to 1998.

Plot
Movie special effects expert Roland "Rollie" Tyler is hired by the Justice Department to stage the murder of mob informant Nicholas DeFranco. DeFranco is set to testify against his former Mafia bosses and go into witness protection, but the Justice Department is afraid he will be killed before the trial. Tyler rigs a gun with blanks and fixes DeFranco up with radio transmitters and fake blood packs to simulate bullet hits. The Justice Department supervisor on the case, Edward Mason, asks Tyler to be the "assassin" wearing a disguise. He is paid $30,000 and assured by Mason that he is "100% protected".

During the preparation, Lipton, the Justice agent in charge, handles Rollie's gun. DeFranco wears Tyler's rig to an Italian restaurant and the public "assassination" goes flawlessly. When Tyler is picked up by Lipton, the agent tries to shoot him. In the struggle for Lipton's gun, the driver is killed and the car crashes, allowing Tyler to escape. He contacts Mason, who is shocked by Lipton's actions and instructs him to wait for other agents to take him to a safe location. Another man thought to be Tyler is killed by the agents, proving that Mason is trying to kill him too. Rollie is worried that Lipton may have switched the blanks in the assassination gun with real bullets, meaning that Rollie really did kill DeFranco.

Rollie retreats to his girlfriend Ellen's apartment. In the morning, Ellen is shot and killed by a sniper aiming for Tyler. Tyler kills the sniper after a fight when he enters the apartment to finish the job.

Manhattan homicide detective Leo McCarthy investigates the death of Ellen and the sniper and realizes it is connected to DeFranco, whom Leo has been pursuing for years. He discovers that the assassination was faked and that Mason planned it. When he is suspended by his captain for his reckless methods, McCarthy manages to steal his boss's badge and gun.

Using an elaborate phone prank, Tyler lures Lipton out in the open and kidnaps him in his official car. He stuffs Lipton into the trunk and takes him on a rough ride to get Mason's address out of him. Tyler steals back his impounded van with the help of his assistant and escapes following a chase through Lower Manhattan with McCarthy's partner. Tyler goes to Mason's mansion where, using his special effects expertise, he incapacitates Mason's guards (and tricks some of them into killing each other). McCarthy arrives and seeing two unconscious guards at the gate, he alerts the State Police.

Mason and DeFranco figure out that Tyler has found them. DeFranco shoots out several windows in Mason's study and Tyler falls through one of the windows, appearing to be dead. Mason and DeFranco try to leave the house when a helicopter arrives, but DeFranco receives an electric shock when he touches the metal screen on an outside door, rigged by Tyler. The shock disrupts DeFranco's pacemaker. Before he dies of heart failure, Mason coerces and takes from him a key to a Swiss safe deposit box containing the funds DeFranco stole from the Mafia.

Mason prepares to escape, but is surprised by the appearance of Tyler, who points an Uzi submachine gun at him. Mason tries to bribe Tyler by giving him the key, proposing that they split the money, but urging immediate departure. Tyler places the gun on a table and tells Mason that the plan won't work. Mason picks up the gun and demands the key back. Tyler shows Mason the bullets for the gun and a tube of Krazy Glue. With the gun glued to Mason's hands, Tyler shoves him out the front door. Misinterpreting his action of walking towards them with a gun in his hands, yet making pleas that "It's a mistake", he is shot by the police.

Tyler's body is found and taken to the morgue. He then gets out of the body bag, removes the makeup simulating his death and exits out a window to escape. He is confronted by McCarthy. The film ends with Tyler impersonating DeFranco at the bank in Geneva and retrieving the $15 million in Mafia funds, after which he and McCarthy make a getaway with the cash.

Cast
 Bryan Brown as Roland "Rollie" Tyler
 Brian Dennehy as Detective Leo McCarthy
 Diane Venora as Ellen
 Cliff De Young as Martin Lipton
 Mason Adams as Colonel Edward Mason
 Jerry Orbach as Nicholas DeFranco
 Joe Grifasi as Mickey
 Trey Wilson as Lieutenant Murdoch
 Tom Noonan as Varrick
 Josie de Guzman as Marisa Velez
 M'el Dowd as Miss Joyce Lehman
 Roscoe Orman as Captain Wallenger
 Martha Gehman as Andy
 Angela Bassett as TV Reporter

Production
The unsolicited screenplay was written by two novice writers, actor Gregory Fleeman and documentarian Robert T. Megginson. Producer Jack Wiener read their script, which was submitted as a low-budget television movie, and felt that it should be made into a theatrical release. Wiener and his co-producer Dodi Fayed hired Robert Mandel, an Off-Broadway director. They did not want to hire an action director, but instead wanted a director who would bring a realistic touch to the film and make the audience care about the main character having been impressed with Mandel's direction of actors in Independence Day. Mandel accepted the job because he wanted to dispel the perception that he was a "soft, arty director". Initially he was not impressed with the film's screenplay, which he felt was not well-crafted but felt that it provided for "a lot of action and a lot of things I did not have under my belt". In preparation for the film's action sequences, Mandel studied chase scenes from Bullitt and The French Connection. To pull off the film's special effects, the producers hired John Stears, who had worked on the first eight James Bond films and shared a special effects Academy Award for Star Wars Episode IV: A New Hope.

Principal photography took place during the summer of 1985 around New York City and in Rye, New York, as well as Toronto, Ontario, Canada. Toronto locations included Sherway Gardens Mall in Etobicoke.

A preview screening in the San Fernando Valley produced some of the best statistics Orion Pictures had seen in some time. A week before its release, a film industry screening was very successful, as was its premiere at the United States Film Festival (later known as the Sundance Film Festival).

Release
While F/X performed well at the box office, grossing over $20 million in North America (well over its $10 million budget), executives at Orion Pictures, which financed and distributed the film, felt that it could have performed even better with a different title. One executive claimed that no one understood what the title meant, but they accepted it because it was what the producers wanted. Wiener admitted that they thought that the two letters together would be "provocative" like MASH and admitted that they had made a mistake.

Reception
Vincent Canby praised the look of the film in his review for The New York Times, writing, "the movie, which looks as if it had been made on an A-picture budget, has a lot of the zest one associates with special-effects-filled B-pictures". Roger Ebert gave the film three and a half stars out of four: In his review for The Globe and Mail, Jay Scott wrote, "F/X is simply out to give a good time, which it does superbly". Paul Attanasio in his review for The Washington Post praised Brian Dennehy's performance:  In his review for The Sunday Times, George Perry praised the film's premise as a "nice idea, but the effects themselves are merely ingenious when they might have been spectacular". Sheila Benson wrote in her review for the Los Angeles Times: 

F/X holds an 89% rating on Rotten Tomatoes based on reviews from 27 critics. The site's consensus states; "Smart, twisty, and perfectly cast, the effects-assisted neo-noir F/X reminds viewers that a well-told story is the most special effect of all."

References

External links
 
 
 

1986 films
1980s action thriller films
1980s chase films
1986 independent films
American films about revenge
American action thriller films
American chase films
American independent films
1980s English-language films
Films directed by Robert Mandel
Films scored by Bill Conti
Films shot in Switzerland
Orion Pictures films
1980s American films